Christopher James Ellison MNZM (born c. 1957) is an New Zealand entrepreneur known as the founder of Mineral Resources Limited, an Australian mining services company.

Early life
Ellison was born in New Zealand. He grew up on a farm outside of Dunedin and attended Otago Boys' High School, leaving school in 1972 at the age of 15.

Business career

Early ventures
In 1978, Ellison moved to Karratha, Western Australia, where he established rigging firm Karratha Rigging and won a contract to work on the North West Shelf Venture. He served as managing director until 1982, when he sold the firm to Walter Wright Industries and subsequently became general manager of its WA/NT division. In 1986 he established Genco Ltd, which was acquired by engineering firm Monadelphous Group in 1988. Ellison became a substantial shareholder in Monadelphous as a result of the acquisition, but the company collapsed in the early 1990s and left him financially ruined.

Mineral Resources
In 2006, Mineral Resources Limited was established by Ellison and others as a merger of three mining services firms – pipeline contractor PIHA, ore-crushing firm Crushing Services International (CSI), and Process Minerals International (PMI). Ellison was a major shareholder in each of the three. Mineral Resources was floated on the Australian Stock Exchange (ASX) in 2006 at 90 cents per share. By 2022 the company's share price had risen to an all-time high of over $71 per share, with Ellison holding around 12 percent of the company.

Other activities
As of 2022, Ellison reportedly owned a 10 percent stake in ASX-listed rare earths explorer VHM Limited.

Personal life
In 2009, Ellison bought a riverside mansion in Mosman Park, Western Australia, for an Australian record price of $57.5 million (equivalent to $ million in ). The property was bought from mining heiress Angela Bennett. In 2022 he and former Mineral Resources board member Tim Roberts purchased an agricultural property near Queenstown, New Zealand, for over NZ$30 million.

Ellison was appointed as New Zealand's honorary consul in Western Australia in 2013. He was appointed a Member of the New Zealand Order of Merit in the 2022 Queen's Birthday Honours, for "services to New Zealand–Australia relations".

Net worth
Ellison became a notional billionaire in 2020, when shares in Mineral Resources hit a record high.

References

New Zealand emigrants to Australia
New Zealand mining businesspeople
Australian company founders
Australian mining entrepreneurs
Members of the New Zealand Order of Merit
1950s births
Living people